Plattsburgh is a city in the U.S. state of New York.

Plattsburgh may also refer to:

 Plattsburgh (town), New York, adjacent to the city
 Plattsburgh, Ohio, an unincorporated community in the U.S.
 "Plattsburgh camps" (1915–1916), privately organized camps for military training
 Battle of Plattsburgh (1814), a battle during the War of 1812
 State University of New York at Plattsburgh, a public university

See also

 
 
 Plattsburg (disambiguation)
 Pittsburgh (disambiguation)
 Pittsburg (disambiguation)